The fifth season of the Bleach anime series is named the . In the English adaptation of the anime released by Viz Media, the title of the season is translated as The Assault. The episodes are directed by Noriyuki Abe, and produced by TV Tokyo, Dentsu and Studio Pierrot. Like the previous season, it does not adapt from Tite Kubo's Bleach manga series. Instead, it features an original, self-contained filler story arc focusing on the invasion of the Soul Society, the home of the Soul Reapers, by the Bount, a race of humans that consume human souls to extend their lives.

The season aired from August 8, 2006, to January 4, 2007, on TV Tokyo. It lasted eighteen episodes. The English adaptation of the season began airing on December 13, 2008 on Cartoon Network's Adult Swim in the United States, and ended on April 11, 2009. Four DVD compilations of the season were released by Aniplex between January 24 and April 25, 2007. The first two DVD compilations contain four episodes of the season, and the last two contain five episodes. Viz Media released this season in four DVD volumes from December 15, 2009 to March 23, 2010. A DVD box set of the season was released on June 8, 2010. Manga Entertainment released the season in two DVDs for the United Kingdom on August 30 and November 1, 2010, while a box set was released on December 20, 2010.

The episodes use four pieces of theme music: two opening themes and two ending themes. The opening theme for the first six episodes is "Tonight, Tonight, Tonight" by Beat Crusaders; the rest of the episodes use "Rolling Star" by Yui. The ending themes are Takacha's "Movin!!", used for the first six episodes, and "Baby It's You" by JUNE, used for the remainder of the episodes. The opening and ending themes for episodes 106 to 109 use footage from the Bleach feature film, Bleach: Memories of Nobody, to promote the film, which was released on December 16, 2006.



Episode list

References

General

Specific

2006 Japanese television seasons
2007 Japanese television seasons
Season 05